Muriella is a genus of green algae in the class Trebouxiophyceae. It is named after Muriel Bristol.

References

External links

Trebouxiophyceae genera
Chlorellaceae